Pedro Mateo Merino (1912–2000) was a Spanish Republican Army colonel in the Spanish Civil War.

He fought at the Battle of the Ebro where as a Militia Major he led the 35th Division, replacing General Karol Świerczewski (General Walter).

He later spent time in exile in the USSR, Czechoslovakia and Cuba.

References

1912 births
2000 deaths
Spanish soldiers
Spanish military personnel of the Spanish Civil War (Republican faction)
Exiles of the Spanish Civil War in Cuba
Exiles of the Spanish Civil War in the Soviet Union
Soviet military personnel of World War II